Cosmopterix longivalvella is a moth of the family Cosmopterigidae. It is known from Zhejiang, China.

The length of the forewings is about 4.5 mm.

The larvae feed on Poaceae species.

References

longivalvella